Fashion Week is an instrumental "soundtrack" album by experimental hip hop group Death Grips. It was self-released, available for free, on January 4, 2015, via Third Worlds, without any prior announcement. It was the band's first release after their supposed disbandment in 2014, and also the first release to not feature vocals from frontman MC Ride, which was a major factor in its mixed-to-positive critical reception.

Fashion Week was released on vinyl as the first LP in a 2LP package alongside Death Grips' instrumental EP Interview 2016 for Record Store Day 2016.

Background
Fashion Week was described by the group as a "soundtrack." A leaked .ZIP file was shared via Reddit in late-2014, containing 6 tracks from the album and 2 unreleased tracks, but was initially dismissed by fans as fake. The song titles, follow as: "Runway J", "Runway E" and so on; acrostically spelling out the phrase "JENNY DEATH WHEN", in reference to the clamor surrounding the upcoming second disc (Jenny Death) of The Powers That B, which was eventually released two months later.

The album art features an image of artist Sua Yoo, who designed the band's cover art for The Money Store, sitting in a large chair located at the Silver Legacy Resort & Casino in Reno, Nevada.

Critical reception

Fashion Week received positive reviews from music critics. At Metacritic, which assigns a normalized rating out of 100 to reviews from critics, the album received an average score of 74, which indicates "generally favorable reviews", based on 5 reviews.

Calum Slingerland of Exclaim! suggested the lack of Ride's performances made the album very accessible to new listeners of Death Grips, and Spin critic Dan Weiss, comparing Fashion Week to Ghosts I-IV by Nine Inch Nails, wrote that while the album is fairly linear, it still has the group's "astoundingly dark and imaginative sonic palette." The Quietus critic Calum Bradbury-Sparvell described the album as "the most vibrant and least menacing collection of tracks Death Grips have released."

One recurring criticism of Fashion Week was the absence of MC Ride's vocals, with one reviewer suggesting that the instrumentals "stagnate" on their own.

Track listing

Personnel
Death Grips
 Zach Hill – drums
 Andy Morin – keyboards, programming
 Nick Reinhart - guitar (Track 12)

References

External links
 

2015 albums
Death Grips albums
Instrumental hip hop albums
Self-released albums